Tatz is a surname. Notable people with the surname include:

Akiva Tatz, South African Orthodox rabbi, inspirational speaker, and writer
Colin Tatz (1934–2019), Professor of Politics
Tino Tatz

See also
Katz (surname)

Jewish surnames